Shaolin Soul is a four-volume compilation of music sampled by the Wu-Tang Clan, and their various solo albums. The samples are principally for the tracks produced by RZA, and as such, largely cover the earlier years of their career.

Reissues and follow-ups
In 2005, the first volume was reissued by Koch Records with a slightly changed track list.

In 2014, a three volume series of albums was also released under the title ''The RZA Presents Shaolin Soul Selection - Volumes 1, 2 and 3.

Track listing

Volume 1

Volume 2

References

Compilation album series
Soul compilation albums
Funk compilation albums
2001 compilation albums
2002 compilation albums